William Walter Smith (14 September 1852 – 3 March 1942) was a New Zealand gardener, naturalist and conservationist. He was born in Hawick, Roxburghshire, Scotland in 1852. He was the initial person in charge of implementing the Scenery Preservation Act of 1903, which led to the creation of scenic and historic reserves.

References

1852 births
1942 deaths
New Zealand gardeners
New Zealand naturalists
New Zealand conservationists
Scottish emigrants to New Zealand